Rock Church may refer to a number of different churches including:

Ethiopia
There are numerous rock churches, see under Monolithic church

Finland
 Temppeliaukio Church, a rock-hewn church in Helsinki

United States
 Rock Church (Auburn, Wyoming), a historic church building
 Rock Church (San Diego), a megachurch in the Liberty Station neighborhood of San Diego, California
 St. Olaf Kirke, a Lutheran church near Cranfills Gap, Texas